is a monorail station on the Osaka Monorail located in Suita, Osaka, Japan. It serves as a station for the Expo Commemoration Park.

Lines
Osaka Monorail Saito Line (Station Number: 51)

Layout
There is an island platform with two tracks.

Adjacent stations 

	

Osaka Monorail stations
Railway stations in Japan opened in 1998